The High Times Medical Cannabis Cup is an annual event celebrating medical marijuana. The first Medical Cannabis Cup took place in San Francisco, California, on June 19–20, 2010. 

Like the High Times Cannabis Cup in Amsterdam, many marijuana strains are judged and cups (trophies) are awarded in a number of categories at the Medical Cup. However, unlike the Cannabis Cup, the Medical Cannabis Cup focuses on the emerging medical marijuana movement in America. As a result, official judging of the strains and edibles is left to a panel of experts. Attendees receive a list of participating medical marijuana dispensaries and state approved medical cannabis patients can visit those marijuana dispensaries and sample the entered strains prior to the event. 

In addition to awarding the best and most medicinal marijuana, hash and edibles from legal medical marijuana dispensaries, the event also includes medical cultivation seminars, a product expo and information on creating a legal "cann-business".

Past winners

2010 San Francisco Medical Cannabis Cup categories and winners
Sativa 

GreanBicycles (Vortex) 
The Green Door San Francisco (Candy Jack)
 Purple Lotus Patient Center (Durban Poison)

Indica 

Mr. Natural Inc (Cali Gold)  
Elemental Wellness (True OG) 
Tehama Herbal Collective (Bubba Kush)

Concentrates
 
Leonard Moore Cooperative (Ingrid)
 Phillips Rx (Herojauna) 
7 Stars Holistic Healing Center (Granddaddy  Purple Wax)  

Edibles 
Greenway Compassionate Relief (Biscotti) 
Medithrive (Bliss Edibles Truffles) 
The Hampton Collective (Totally Baked Medibles Tincture)  

Expo Booth 
Humboldt Patients Resource Center 
TIE: Cmaz Glass, Green Door 
Stealth Grow LED  

Glass 
Zong 2 Kink Jack Herer Bong 
Glass Slider 
Cmaz Vhorees  

Product 
TIE: Essential Vaaapp H2O Eclipse, Stealth Grow LED 
Grassroots High Times Medical Cannabis Cup Hat 
TIE: Canna Fresh, Boldt Bags

2011 San Francisco Medical Cannabis Cup winners

SATIVA

 Granddaddy Purple Collective, Bay 11
 OrganiCann, Alpha Blue
 Happy Lil' Trees, Sonoma Coma

Indica

 Harborside Health Center (San Jose), Delta559's Bogglegum
 Elemental Wellness Center, The True OG
 Stars Holistic Healing Center, 7 Star Pure Kush

Hybrid

 D & M Compassion Center, OG Kush
 Buds & Roses, Star Dawg
 Leonard Moore Co-Operative, The Pure

Concentrates

 Philips Rx, Mars OG
 Berkeley Patients Group, Sour Diesel Wax
 The Cali Connection Seed Company Collective, Regulator Kush Wax

Non Solvent Hash

 Florin Wellness Center, Herojuana

CBD AWARD

 Master Control Unit Collective, Alaskan Thunderfuck (9.23%)
 Elemental Wellness, Center, Jamaican Lion (8.10%)

Edibles Cup

Greenway Compassionate Relief's Baklava
 Bhang Chocolate's Bhang Chocolate Triple Strength Fire Bar
 Vapor Room Co-operative, Om Chocolate Dipped Peanut Butter Truffle
 
Best Booth

Magnolia Wellness
 Nor Cal Genetics Seed Collective
 Element Wellness  

Best Product

 Glass M420 by Incredibowl Industries

2011 Denver Medical Cannabis Cup categories and winners
Sativa

Snow Dog (Natural Alternatives)
Alpha Blue (The Farm)
Island Sweet Skunk (Grassroots Wellness)

Indica

Banana Kush (Mile High Green Cross)
L.A. confidential (420 Wellness)
Chemdawg (Highland Health)

Best Hybrid

Sour Grape (Mile High Green Cross)
White Dawg (A Cut Above) 
Banana Kush (Highland Health)

Best Concentrates

Grape Ape Wax (Salida green Cross)
Hong Kong Stable Oil (Broadway Wellness)
Lemon G-13 (Greenest Green)

Best Edibles

DECA DOSE  (Cheeba Chews)
Pecanna Bar (Standing Akimbo)
Mountain Medicine Blueberry Pie Bar (Good Chemistry) 

Best Product

Incredibowl m420 (Incredibowl Industries)
Vortex Tubes (Hitman Glass) 
Crucible Titanium Nail/Bar (Broadway Wellness) 

Best Glass
D-Rock and Adam G. Worked Glass Bubbler (Lazy J's Smoke Shop)
Glass Oil Tube with attached Glass Blowtorch (Hitman Glass)
 Incredibowl Sherlock (Incredibowl Industries) 

Best Exhibitor Booth

Lazy J's Smoke Shop
Incredibowl Industries

See also

List of cannabis competitions

References

External links

American cannabis awards
Culture of San Francisco
Cannabis events
Recurring events established in 2010
2010 in cannabis
Cannabis in California